Radio frequency (RF) is the oscillation rate of an alternating electric current or voltage or of a magnetic, electric or electromagnetic field or mechanical system in the frequency range from around  to around . This is roughly between the upper limit of audio frequencies and the lower limit of infrared frequencies; these are the frequencies at which energy from an oscillating current can radiate off a conductor into space as radio waves.  Different sources specify different upper and lower bounds for the frequency range.

Electric current  
Electric currents that oscillate at radio frequencies (RF currents) have special properties not shared by direct current or lower audio frequency alternating current, such as the 50 or 60 Hz current used in electrical power distribution.
 Energy from RF currents in conductors can radiate into space as electromagnetic waves (radio waves).  This is the basis of radio technology.
 RF current does not penetrate deeply into electrical conductors but tends to flow along their surfaces; this is known as the skin effect.
 RF currents applied to the body often do not cause the painful sensation and muscular contraction of electric shock that lower frequency currents produce. This is because the current changes direction too quickly to trigger depolarization of nerve membranes. However this does not mean RF currents are harmless; they can cause internal injury as well as serious superficial burns called RF burns.
 RF current can easily ionize air, creating a conductive path through it. This property is exploited by "high frequency" units used in electric arc welding, which use currents at higher frequencies than power distribution uses.
 Another property is the ability to appear to flow through paths that contain insulating material, like the dielectric insulator of a capacitor. This is because capacitive reactance in a circuit decreases with increasing frequency.
 In contrast, RF current can be blocked by a coil of wire, or even a single turn or bend in a wire. This is because the inductive reactance of a circuit increases with increasing frequency.
 When conducted by an ordinary electric cable, RF current has a tendency to reflect from discontinuities in the cable, such as connectors, and travel back down the cable toward the source, causing a condition called standing waves. RF current may be carried efficiently over transmission lines such as coaxial cables.

Frequency bands

The radio spectrum of frequencies is divided into bands with conventional names designated by the International Telecommunication Union (ITU):
{| class="wikitable" style="text-align:right"
|-
! scope="col" rowspan="2" | Frequencyrange !! scope="col" rowspan="2" | Wavelengthrange !! scope="col" colspan="2" | ITU designation !! scope="col" rowspan="2" | IEEE bands
|-
! scope="col" | Full name
! scope="col" | Abbreviation
|-
! scope="row"  | Below 3 Hz
| >105 km || || style="text-align:center" | ||  
|-
! scope="row"  | 3–30 Hz
| 105–104 km|| Extremely low frequency || style="text-align:center" | ELF || 
|-
! scope="row"  | 30–300 Hz
| 104–103 km|| Super low frequency || style="text-align:center" | SLF || 
|-
! scope="row"  | 300–3000 Hz
|  103–100 km|| Ultra low frequency || style="text-align:center" | ULF || 
|-
! scope="row"  | 3–30 kHz
| 100–10 km|| Very low frequency || style="text-align:center" | VLF || 
|-
! scope="row"  | 30–300 kHz
| 10–1 km|| Low frequency || style="text-align:center" | LF || 
|-
! scope="row"  | 300 kHz – 3 MHz
| 1 km – 100 m|| Medium frequency || style="text-align:center" | MF || 
|-
! scope="row"  | 3–30 MHz
| 100–10 m|| High frequency || style="text-align:center" | HF  || style="text-align:center" | HF
|-
! scope="row"  | 30–300 MHz
| 10–1 m|| Very high frequency || style="text-align:center" | VHF || style="text-align:center" | VHF
|-
! scope="row"  | 300 MHz – 3 GHz
| 1 m – 100 mm|| Ultra high frequency || style="text-align:center" | UHF || style="text-align:center" | UHF, L, S
|-
! scope="row"  | 3–30 GHz
| 100–10 mm|| Super high frequency || style="text-align:center" | SHF || style="text-align:center" | S, C, X, Ku, K, Ka
|-
! scope="row"  | 30–300 GHz
| 10–1 mm|| Extremely high frequency || style="text-align:center" | EHF || style="text-align:center" | Ka, V, W, mm
|-
! scope="row"  | 300 GHz – 3 THz
|  1 mm – 0.1 mm|| Tremendously high frequency || style="text-align:center" | THF || 
|}

Frequencies of 1 GHz and above are conventionally called microwave, while frequencies of 30 GHz and above are designated millimeter wave.
More detailed band designations are given by the standard IEEE letter- band frequency designations and the 	EU/NATO frequency designations.

Applications

Communications
Radio frequencies are used in communication devices such as transmitters, receivers, computers, televisions, and mobile phones, to name a few. Radio frequencies are also applied in carrier current systems including telephony and control circuits. The MOS integrated circuit is the technology behind the current proliferation of radio frequency wireless telecommunications devices such as cellphones.

Medicine 

Medical applications of radio frequency (RF) energy, in the form of electromagnetic waves (radio waves) or electrical currents, have existed for over 125 years, and now include diathermy, hyperthermy treatment of cancer, electrosurgery scalpels used to cut and cauterize in operations, and radiofrequency ablation. Magnetic resonance imaging (MRI) uses radio frequency fields to generate images of the human body.

Measurement
Test apparatus for radio frequencies can include standard instruments at the lower end of the range, but at higher frequencies, the test equipment becomes more specialized.

Mechanical oscillations
While RF usually refers to electrical oscillations, mechanical RF systems are not uncommon: see mechanical filter and RF MEMS.

See also
 Amplitude modulation (AM)
 Bandwidth (signal processing)
 Electromagnetic interference
 Electromagnetic radiation
 Electromagnetic spectrum
 EMF measurement
 Frequency allocation
 Frequency modulation (FM)
 Plastic welding
 Pulsed electromagnetic field therapy
 Spectrum management

References

External links
 Analog, RF and EMC Considerations in Printed Wiring Board (PWB) Design
 Definition of frequency bands (VLF, ELF … etc.) IK1QFK Home Page (vlf.it)
 Radio, light, and sound waves, conversion between wavelength and frequency 
 RF Terms Glossary 

Radio spectrum
Radio waves
Radio waves
Television terminology